Senator O'Brien may refer to:

Anna Belle Clement O'Brien (1923–2009), Tennessee State Senate
Charles H. O'Brien (1920–2007), Tennessee State Senate
Duncan T. O'Brien (1895–1938), New York State Senate
Henry L. O'Brien (1869–1935), New York State Senate
James H. O'Brien (1860–1924), New York State Senate
James O'Brien (U.S. Congressman) (1841–1907), New York State Senate
Jay O'Brien (Virginia politician) (born 1951), Virginia State Senate
Jeremiah O'Brien (Maine politician) (1778–1858), Maine State Senate
Leo P. O'Brien (1893–1968), Wisconsin State Senate
Margaret O'Brien (politician) (born 1973), Michigan State Senate
Sean O'Brien (Ohio politician) (born 1969), Ohio State Senate
Shannon O'Brien (born 1959), Massachusetts State Senate
Ted O'Brien (born 1956), New York State Senate

See also
James O'Bryan Jr. (born 1956), U.S. Virgin Islands State Senate
Senator Bryan (disambiguation)